Red Shoes may refer to:

People
 Red Shoes (Choctaw chief), assassination in 1747 sparked a British and French War
 Red Shoes (Muskogean chief), leader who died in 1783
 Red Shoes Unno, ring name of New Japan Pro-Wrestling referee Hiroyuki Umino and father of Shota Umino

Entertainment
 Red Shoes (TV series), a 2021 South Korean TV series
 Red Shoes and the Seven Dwarfs, a 2019 South Korean computer-animated film
 A character in the novel Shell Shaker by Native American LeAnne Howe
 "Red Shoes", a song by English band Midas
 "Red Shoes", a song by Dick Morrissey from the 1986 album Souliloquy
 "Red Shoes", a song in the Little River Band album Live in America
 "(The Angels Wanna Wear My) Red Shoes", a song from the 1977 Elvis Costello album My Aim Is True
 Akai Kutsu (Red Shoes), a 1922 Japanese children's song

Other uses
 Red Shoes (missile),  a British surface-to-air missile

See also
 
 The Red Shoes (disambiguation)
 Papal shoes, traditionally red shoes worn by the head of the Roman Catholic Church